lorcon (acronym for Loss Of Radio CONnectivity) is an open source network tool. It is a library for injecting 802.11 (WLAN) frames, capable of injecting via multiple driver frameworks, without the need to change the application code. Lorcon is built by patching the third-party MadWifi-driver for cards based on the Qualcomm Atheros wireless chipset.

The project is maintained by Joshua Wright and Michael Kershaw ("dragorn").

References

External links 
 Official Home Page
 

Network analyzers
Unix security-related software
Unix network-related software
Computer security exploits
IEEE 802.11